Nathalie Dechy (born 21 February 1979) is a former professional tennis player from France.

Dechy is a three-time doubles Grand Slam champion, winning the 2006 US Open women's doubles title with Vera Zvonareva, the 2007 French Open mixed doubles title with Andy Ram, and the 2007 US Open women's doubles title with Dinara Safina. Her biggest singles achievement is reaching the semifinals of the 2005 Australian Open.

At the 2008 Wimbledon Championships, she faced world No. 1 and reigning French Open champion Ana Ivanovic. She had a match point during the second set before losing 7–6, 6–7, 8–10.

Since 2015, Nathalie Dechy has been the director of the Biarritz Tennis Tournament, a women's tennis tournament organized every year by the Quarterback agency at Biarritz Olympic Tennis. This tournament is part of the ITF (International Tennis Federation) category and has $80,000 in prize money.

Grand Slam finals

Women's doubles: 2 (2 titles)

Mixed doubles: 1 (title)

Grand Slam singles performance timeline

WTA career finals

Singles: 5 (1 title, 4 runner-ups)

Doubles: 14 (7 titles, 7 runner-ups)

ITF Circuit finals

Singles (1-2)

Doubles (1-1)

Personal life
Dechy was born to a father from continental France and a Canadian mother from the Eastern Townships of Quebec. She holds dual French-Canadian citizenship. On 25 January 2010 she gave birth to a son.

References

External links

 
 
 
 
 
 

1979 births
Living people
French people of Canadian descent
Olympic tennis players of France
Tennis players at the 2000 Summer Olympics
Tennis players at the 2004 Summer Olympics
French female tennis players
French Open champions
US Open (tennis) champions
Grand Slam (tennis) champions in women's doubles
Grand Slam (tennis) champions in mixed doubles